Romeo y Julieta  is an Argentine soap opera based on the play of the same name by William Shakespeare. It stars Brenda Gandini and Elias Viñoles and is set in the present day. It premiered on March 14, 2007 on Channel 9.

Plot
Julieta Caporale and Romeo Montero are students, who meet in the streets of the picturesque Verona. Both believe deeply in true love and wish to explore the magical setting in which took place the tragic story of the couple of Shakespeare. Julieta is a lovely young lady aged 16. Beautiful, lively, romantic and passionate about photography. Hates the superficial world of her parents and she dreams to meet the man of her life. After encouragement of her father, Vittorio, she enters a superficial relationship with the Polo. Her father, taking advantage of the situation, seeks a marriage between them to serve his own interests. Romeo is about 17 years old. He's cute and clever. He loves music and literature and has many spiritual concerns. Extremely romantic, he knows how to speak beautifully. He goes out with Barbara and believes he is in love with her, but realizes that Julieta is the great love of his life. A number of coincidences bring insurmountable obstacles in the relationship of two young kids: Their families have been for decades in vendetta and hatred passed from generation to generation. Their descendants, however, Romeo and Julieta, will mingle in school and eventually live a love that will divide their classmates and friends to supporters and opponents.

Cast and characters
Elías Viñoles – Romeo Montero
Brenda Gandini – Julieta Caporale
Magalí Moro – Isabel Campos de Caporale
César Vianco – Vittorio Caporale
Benjamín Amadeo – Leo Caporale
Graciela Tenenbaum – Rosa Medina
Diana Lamas – Elena Pereyra de Montero
Álex Benn – Bruno Montero
Jessica Schultz – Amalia Verbena
Tony Lestingi – Arturo Verbena
Elsa Pinill – Barbara Verbena
Edward Nutkiewicz – Donato Caporale
Jorge García Marino – Natalio Caporale
Anahí Martella – Perla
César Bordón – Padre Antonio
Bernarda Pagés – Catherine Sullivan
Norberto Gonzalo – Pedro Edmundo Panetti
Sofía Elliot – Luz Ansaldi
Sebastián Pajoni – Gaspar Ferro

Soundtrack
01 – Juntando Estrellas (Dolores Sarmiento, Elías Viñoles, Brenda Gandini y Benjamín Amadeo) Autores: (Ezequiel Suárez – P. Ramírez)
02 – Amor Prohibido (Brenda Gandini y Elías Viñoles) Autores: (Ezequiel Suárez – P. Ramírez)
03 – Hey (Brenda Gandini) Autores: (Ezequiel Suárez – P. Ramirez)
04 – Muriendo de Amor (Jazmín Beccar-Varela, Ariadna Asturzzi, Dolores Sarmiento y Liz Moreno) Autores: (Claudio Leda – Pablo Ramírez)
05 – Amigas (Brenda Gandini e Inés Palombo) Autores: (Ezequiel Suárez – P. Ramírez)
06 – Rompiendo Barreras (Benjamín Amadeo) Autores: (Ezequiel Suárez – P. Ramírez)
07 – Flechazo (Brenda Gandini) Autores: (Ezequiel Suárez- P. Ramírez)
08 – Gotas de Amor (Elsa Pinilla) Autores: (Ezequiel Suárez – P. Ramírez)
09 – Ni Medio Segundo (Elías Viñoles) Autores: (Ezequiel Suárez – P. Ramírez)
10 – Amor Letal (Brenda Gandini y Elsa Pinilla) Autores: (Ezequiel Suárez – P. Ramírez)
11 – Dentro de Mí (Elías Viñoles) Autores: (Ezequiel Suárez – P. Ramírez)
12 – Flechazo (remix) (Brenda Gandini) Autores: (Ezequiel Suárez – P. Ramírez)
13 – Mi Dulce Bombón (Elías Viñoles) Autores: (Ezequiel Suárez – P. Ramírez)
In the Greek version of Romeo y Julieta most of the songs been translated in a Greek version, some of them are
Anikiti Agapi
Otan mas apagorevoun thn agapi afti-(Amor Prohibido)

Worldwide syndication
:  TVN
:  ET1, ET3 
:  Sony Entertainment Television and Jetix
:  Telepacífico
:  Monte Carlo TV
:  ANT1 Cyprus
:  Jetix
:  Rustavi2

References

2000s Argentine television series
2010s Argentine television series
2007 Argentine television series debuts
Television series about teenagers